BBC Radio WM is the BBC's local radio station serving the West Midlands.

It broadcasts on FM, DAB, digital TV and via BBC Sounds from studios at The Mailbox in Birmingham.

According to RAJAR, the station has a weekly audience of 239,000 listeners and a 4.1% share as of December 2022.

History

Until 2004, BBC WM broadcast from the Pebble Mill studios, in Edgbaston. On 4 July of that year, the station moved to the new BBC Birmingham city centre offices in The Mailbox. Its facilities include two broadcast studios, a talk studio, an operations and production area, and a studio shared with the BBC Asian Network.

On 23 November 1981, the station changed its name to BBC WM  and had a studio in the back of a shop in New Street. The shop sold trinkets branded with the Radio WM identity.

A short-lived service called WM Heartlands ran between early 1989 and 1991 serving the 'Heartlands' area of East Birmingham using the 1458MW frequency. It ran as an experiment, opting out from 0800 until 1200, with the Asian Network using the same frequency in the evenings.

As a 1990s economy measure, BBC WM took over BBC CWR in Coventry and Warwickshire. On 3 September 2005, CWR resumed the production of separate programming between 5am and 10pm each weekday (6am-6pm at weekends).

BBC Radio Wolverhampton

On 15 January 2021, BBC Radio Wolverhampton launched as a temporary sister station. The service provided eight hours of opt-out programming for listeners in Wolverhampton and the surrounding area each weekday until 31 March 2021.

Audience
When it launched, the station had a monopoly of local radio in the Birmingham area. The station's low audience since the advent of independent local radio has led to reports of threatened closure on various occasions. In the mid-1980s, a new manager, Tony Inchley, brought in extensive format changes with a view to stabilising the audience, although the station remained small in listenership numbers.

Programming

Local programming is produced and broadcast from the BBC's Birmingham studios from 6am - 1am each day.

Off-peak programming, including the late show from 10pm - 1am, is simulcast with sister stations in the BBC Midlands and BBC East Midlands regions.

During the station's downtime, BBC Radio WM simulcasts overnight programming from BBC Radio 5 Live and BBC Radio London.

Notable presenters

Notable presenters include:
 Gordon Astley
 Malcolm Boyden
 Tony Butler
 Tim Smith
 Carl Chinn (1994–2012)
 Alan Dedicoat (1979–1985)
 Ed Doolan (1982–2011, died in 2018)
 Adrian Goldberg (2003–2006, 2010–2017, 2018–2020)
 Alex Lester (2017–2020)
 Stuart Linnell 
 Tony Wadsworth and Julie Mayer
 Janice Long (2000–2010, died in 2021)
 Andrew Peach
 Peter Powell (1970–1975)
 Les Ross (1970– 1976) and (2005-2009)
 Sunny and Shay (2014–2020)
 Graham Torrington (2012–2020)

References

External links
BBC WM website
BBC WM: The first 40 years – 58-minute radio documentary by BBC WM (streaming audio)

Radio stations established in 1970
WM
Radio stations in Birmingham, West Midlands
1970 establishments in England